Elizabethtown is a home rule-class city and the county seat of Hardin County, Kentucky, United States. The population was 28,531 at the 2010 census, and was estimated at 30,289 by the U.S. Census Bureau in 2019, making it the 11th-largest city in the state. It is included in (and the principal city of) the Elizabethtown–Fort Knox, Kentucky Metropolitan Statistical Area, which is included in the Louisville/Jefferson County–Elizabethtown–Madison, Kentucky-Indiana Combined Statistical Area. The Elizabethtown Metropolitan area had a 2019 estimated population of 153,057, making it the 5th largest metropolitan area in the state.

Geography
Interstate 65 passes through the southeast side of the city, leading north-northeast  to Louisville and southwest  to Bowling Green. The Western Kentucky Parkway starts at I-65 in Elizabethtown and leads west  to Eddyville. To the east, the Bluegrass Parkway leads  to Lexington.

The Elizabethtown–Fort Knox metropolitan area consists of Hardin, Meade, and Larue counties, and includes Radcliff, a city about three-fourths the size of Elizabethtown; the housing areas of the Fort Knox Military Installation; the unincorporated town of Rineyville; and other communities such as Vine Grove, Glendale, Sonora, West Point, and Upton.

Climate
The climate in this area is characterized by hot, humid summers and generally mild to cool winters.  According to the Köppen Climate Classification system, Elizabethtown has a humid subtropical climate, abbreviated "Cfa" on climate maps.

History

Established in 1793, Hardin County was named for Colonel John Hardin, an Indian fighter who worked with tribes in the local area. In a few years, professional men and tradesmen came to live in the area. In 1793, Colonel Andrew Hynes had  (until then known as the "Severn's Valley Settlement") surveyed and laid off into lots and streets to establish Elizabethtown. Named in honor of his wife, Elizabethtown was legally established in 1797.

Thomas Lincoln helped Samuel Haycraft build a millrace at Haycraft's mill on Valley Creek. After Lincoln married Nancy Hanks in 1806, they lived in a log cabin built in Elizabethtown. Their daughter, Sarah, was born there in 1807. Soon after, they moved to the Sinking Spring Farm, where Abraham Lincoln was born in 1809. Thomas Lincoln took his family to Indiana in 1816. After his wife died in 1818, he returned to Elizabethtown and married Sarah Bush Johnston, widowed since 1816. She and her three children accompanied Thomas back to Indiana, where Sarah was stepmother to Thomas' two children.

On March 5, 1850, the Commonwealth of Kentucky granted a charter to the Louisville and Nashville Railroad Company authorizing it to raise funds and built a railroad from Louisville to the Tennessee state line in the direction of Nashville. John L. Helm, the grandson of Capt. Thomas Helm, became the president of the railroad in October 1854; he directed construction of the main stem of the rail line through Elizabethtown. The rail line was completed to Elizabethtown in 1858, with the first train arriving on June 15, 1858. The opening of the railroad brought economic growth to Elizabethtown, which became an important trade center along the railroad and a strategic point during the Civil War.

On December 27, 1862, Confederate General John Hunt Morgan and his 3,000-man cavalry attacked Elizabethtown. During the battle, more than 100 cannonballs were fired into the town. Although he successfully captured Elizabethtown, Morgan's chief goal was to disrupt the railroad and northern transportation. He proceeded north along the railroad, burning trestles and destroying sections of the track. After the battle, one cannonball was found lodged in the side of a building on the public square. After the building burned in 1887 and was rebuilt, the cannonball was replaced in the side wall, as close to its original site as possible, where it remains in the present day. It is located in the Joey Lee building, which is located on the historic town square. The building is currently owned and houses the office of attorney Roger T. Rigney, it also features a plaquard noting the cannonball and the history behind it out front.

From 1871 to 1873 during the Reconstruction Era, the Seventh Cavalry and a battalion of the Fourth Infantry, led by General George Armstrong Custer, were stationed in Elizabethtown. The military were assigned to suppress the local Ku Klux Klan under the Enforcement Acts, as their members had been attacking freedmen and other Republicans. They also broke up illegal distilleries, which began to flourish in the South after the Civil War. General Custer and his wife Elizabeth lived in a small cottage behind Aunt Beck Hill's boarding house, now known as the Brown-Pusey House.

Culture
The town is regionally referred to as "E-town" (sometimes with an apostrophe in place of the dash). It is one of two larger towns (the other being Bowling Green) along I-65 between Louisville and Nashville. The movie Elizabethtown (2005) was named after the town; most of the footage was filmed in Versailles and Louisville because Elizabethtown has lost much of its historic architecture in recent years due to commercial development.

Alcohol sales
Elizabethtown is officially classified by the Kentucky Department of Alcoholic Beverage Control (ABC) as being in a "moist county". Under ABC terminology, "moist" indicates that at least one city within a county has approved packaged alcohol sales. In popular usage, the term "moist" more often refers to the city's former status as allowing by-the-drink sales in restaurants, but not package sales.

Despite the county being a dry county, alcoholic drink sales have long been allowed in restaurants seating at least 100 diners and deriving at least 70% of their total sales from food. Beer, wine and spirits can be purchased at licensed liquor stores, drug stores and grocery outlets, beer can be purchased at most convenience stores . The locals classify this as a "damp" or "moist" county. In 2011, the residents of Elizabethtown, Radcliff, and Vine Grove voted to allow properly licensed businesses to sell package liquor, wine, and beer.

Transportation
The city is served by the Elizabethtown Regional Airport (EKX), and the Elizabethtown Airport Board was as of 2013 exploring options to bring commercial services to the city.

Demographics

As of the census of 2010, there were 28,531 people, 15,711 households, and 9,345 families residing in the city. The population density was 936.6/mi2 (361.6/km2). There were 12,664 housing units at an average density of 490.5/mi2 (189.4/km). The racial makeup of the city was 80.4% White (78.1% non-Hispanic), 19.6% African American, 0.34% Native American or Alaska Native, 2.6% Asian, 0.18% Pacific Islander, 1.3% from other races, and 3.4% from two or more races.  Hispanics or Latinos of any race were 4.3% of the population.

There were 15,711 households, out of which 30.5% had children under the age of 18 living with them, 43.2% were married couples living together, 15.1% had a female householder with no husband present, 4.4% had a male householder with no wife present, and 37.3% were non-families. 32.1% of all households were made up of individuals, and 10.9% had someone living alone who was 65 years of age or older. The average household size was 2.34 and the average family size was 2.94.

The age distribution was 25.1% under 18, 9.8% from 18 to 24, 27.5% from 25 to 44, 24.4% from 45 to 64, and 13.2% who were 65 or older. The median age was 35.4 years. For every 100 females, there were 91.9 males. For every 100 females age 18 and over, there were 87.4 males.

Full economic data for Kentucky locations from the 2010 Census has not yet been released. As of the 2010 Census, median income for a household in the city was $40,720, and the median income for a family was $54,699. Full-time male workers had a median income of $43,406 versus $30,310 for females. The per capita income for the city was $23,627. As of the 2000 Census, about 8.5% of families and 10.5% of the population were below the poverty line, including 14.6% of those under age 18 and 9.1% of those age 65 or over.

In 2000, Hardin County, Kentucky and LaRue County, Kentucky were defined as the Elizabethtown, KY Metropolitan Statistical Area by the Bureau of the Census; the name of the region was changed in 2013 to Elizabethtown–Fort Knox, KY Metropolitan Statistical Area. It is part of the Louisville–Elizabethtown–Bardstown, KY-IN Combined Statistical Area.

Education

Elizabethtown Independent Schools
Elizabethtown Independent Schools operates:
 Elizabethtown High School
 T.K. Stone Middle School
 Morningside Elementary School
 Helmwood Heights Elementary School
 Valley View Educational Center

Hardin County Schools
The Hardin County Schools (HCS) are another district that encompasses some of the city limits.

Here are the schools located within the city limits:

 Bluegrass Middle School
 Central Hardin High School
 G.C. Burkhead Elementary School
 Heartland Elementary School
 Lincoln Trail Elementary School
 New Highland Elementary School

Although New Highland Elementary, Bluegrass Middle School, and John Hardin High School have an Elizabethtown mailing address, and some Elizabethtown residents are zoned into those schools, they are actually within the city limits of neighboring Radcliff. Similarly, the HCS headquarters is located in Radcliff but served by the Elizabethtown post office. Conversely, Central Hardin High is within the city limits of Elizabethtown but has a mailing address of Cecilia.

Private schools
 Saint James Catholic Regional School
 Gloria Dei Lutheran School

Post-secondary education
Elizabethtown is home to Elizabethtown Community and Technical College, a member of the Kentucky Community and Technical College System, as well as Empire Beauty School formerly the Hair Design School on Westport Road. Also, Western Kentucky University has a regional campus located on post at Fort Knox and in a building that is shared with ECTC in Elizabethtown.

The Elizabethtown Japanese School (エリザベスタウン日本人補習校 Erizabesutaun Nihonjin Hoshūkō), a weekend Japanese program, holds its classes at the Elizabethtown Community and Technical College.

Public library
Elizabethtown has a lending library, a branch of the Hardin County Public Library.

Sister cities
Elizabethtown has one sister city, as designated by Sister Cities International:

 Koori, Fukushima, Japan

Churches

The first Baptist settlement west of the Allegheny Mountains was in Elizabethtown at Severns Valley Baptist Church, named after the original name of Elizabethtown. Catholics came west from Nelson County and settled at Colesburg at St. Clare Parish before coming to St. James Parish in Elizabethtown. Lucinda Helm helped bring United Methodists into Elizabethtown, and they immortalized her in naming the Helm Memorial United Methodist Church, today simply called MUMC. More than 12 denominations are represented by over 100 churches in Elizabethtown.

Notable people
 Nathan Adcock, MLB pitcher for the Kansas City Royals
 Philip Arnold, confidence trickster, most famous for the diamond hoax of 1872
 Antwain Barbour, American professional basketball player and former member of the Kentucky Wildcats men's basketball team.
 Ben M. Bogard, clergyman, founder of the American Baptist Association, born in Elizabethtown in 1868
 Mark Bradley, outfielder for the New York Mets and Los Angeles Dodgers from 1981 to 1983
 John Y. Brown, 31st Governor of Kentucky and former Representative of Kentucky's 2nd district (1873–1877) & 5th district (1859–1861)
Chaz Cardigan, Alternative rock musician
 Frank Chelf, United States representative from Kentucky
 David Dao, doctor, passenger notable for being dragged off United Airlines Flight 3411
 Brandon Deaderick, NFL defensive tackle drafted by the New England Patriots and currently plays for the Jacksonville Jaguars
 Steve Delabar, MLB relief pitcher for the Toronto Blue Jays
 Greg Downs, award-winning author
 Daniel Cameron, 51st Attorney General of Kentucky
 Sarah Lincoln Grigsby, sister of Abraham Lincoln; born in Elizabethtown
 Benjamin Hardin Helm, brigadier general, Confederate States Army
 John LaRue Helm, 18th and 24th Governor of Kentucky
 Walter Dee Huddleston, U.S. Senator from 1973 to 1985
 Andrew Hynes, founder of Elizabethtown, which he named after his wife
 Steve Jameson, award-winning painter and children's book illustrator
 Joshua Jewett, former Representative of the 5th district, (1855–1859)
 Keen Johnson, 45th Governor of Kentucky
 Sarah Bush Johnston, second wife of Thomas Lincoln and stepmother to President Abraham Lincoln
 Jimmie Lee, member of the Kentucky House of Representatives representing District 25
 Thomas Lincoln, father of President Abraham Lincoln
 Usher F. Linder, Illinois Attorney General 
 Danny Lloyd, actor in The Shining
 Douglas Lucas, singer-songwriter and musician with Sony/ATV Music Publishing
 Charles B. Middleton, stage and film actor, famous for his role as Ming the Merciless in the Flash Gordon movie serials
 Daniel Martin Moore, singer-songwriter; born in Elizabethtown
 Dennis Parrett, member of the Kentucky Senate representing District 10
 Kenny Perry, professional PGA Tour golfer
 Todd Perry, former NFL offensive guard for the Chicago Bears and Miami Dolphins
 Steffphon Pettigrew, professional basketball player
 Kelly Rutherford, television and film actress, famous for her roles on Generations, Melrose Place, Gossip Girl and The Adventures of Brisco County, Jr.
 Chris Todd, Auburn Tigers quarterback

In fiction
Elizabethtown is the eponym of the 2005 film Elizabethtown starring Orlando Bloom and Kirsten Dunst. The film was known for the Manic Pixie Dream Girl trope created by Nathan Rabin in a review of Dunst's character.

References
 Ernie Lewis Quarterback University of Kentucky 1972,73,74
                              Pitcher University of Kentucky,  1973

Further reading

External links
 City of Elizabethtown official site
 "Elizabethtown's new $29 million, 150-acre youth sports complex"—The New York Times, September 6, 2011

 
Cities in Hardin County, Kentucky
Cities in Kentucky
County seats in Kentucky
Elizabethtown metropolitan area
Populated places established in 1797